George Lawrence Petros (born 11 January 1955) is an American art designer, author, editor, interviewer and illustrator. From 1984 through 1992 he published and edited EXIT, a punk-inspired art and science fiction magazine he founded with Adam Parfrey and Kim Seltzer. From 1992 through 2000 he edited and art-directed Seconds, an all-interview music and culture magazine founded by Steven Blush. From 2000 through 2005 he was a contributing editor of Juxtapoz, the low-brow art magazine founded by Robert Williams, and the senior editor of Propaganda, a goth/industrial music and style magazine founded by Fred H. Berger.
He is the author of Art That Kills: A Panoramic Portrait of Aesthetic Terrorism 1984-2001, The New Transsexuals: The Next Step In Human Evolution, and the editor of American Hardcore: A Tribal History.

His art and writing have appeared in Heavy Metal, Thrasher, Paper, Screw, Apocalypse Culture II, ArtSync, and on DEVO album covers.

Early life
Petros was born in Chicago, Illinois. His father, uncle and grandfather were plumbers and mechanical engineers. The family moved to Clearwater, Florida, in 1968. Petros returned to Chicago in 1978, where he studied commercial art at Ray-Vogue Institute of Design and worked as an engineering technician for the City of Chicago. In 1982 he moved to New York City.

Magazine work

EXIT 
EXIT was a New York City-based large-format alternative comic art, science fiction and graphics magazine published from 1984 through 1992. It was founded in 1983 by Petros, Adam Parfrey and Kim Seltzer, with R. Bruce Ritchie joining shortly afterward. Five issues were released; a sixth was partially completed. Parfrey left in 1987.

Seconds 
Seconds was a New York City-based all-interview music, culture and true crime magazine founded in 1987 by promoter and DJ Steven Blush. The magazine was a fusion of punk rock and heavy metal sensibilities. It also covered R&B and hip hop. The final issue appeared in 2000.

Petros began writing for Seconds in 1987; in 1992 he became editor and occasional art director. The magazine expanded its coverage to include individuals involved with science and science fiction.

Propaganda 
Propaganda was a Gothic subculture magazine founded in 1982 by New York City-photographer Fred H. Berger. It focused on all aspects of goth culture, including fashion, sexuality, music, art, literature, body modification, BDSM, paganism, role-playing, vampirism, and fetishism. Petros began writing for the magazine in 2000 and in 2001 was appointed senior editor.

Books
Exploding Hearts Exploding Stars: The Serial Art and Propagandart of George Petros by George Petros (Norman Gosney Publications, 1992)
The EXIT Collection edited by George Petros, Michael Andros, associate editor (Tacit, 1998)
American Hardcore: A Tribal History by Steven Blush, edited by George Petros (Feral House, 2001)
.45 Dangerous Minds: The Most Intense Interviews From Seconds Magazine edited by Steven Blush and George Petros (Creation Books, 2005)
Art That Kills: A Panoramic Portrait of Aesthetic Terrorism 1984-2001 by George Petros (Creation Books, 2006)
Les Barany's Carnivora edited by George Petros (Scapegoat Publications, 2008)
The New Transsexuals: The Next Step In Human Evolution by George Petros (PetrosIdeas, 2012)

Musical compilations
Black Sunshine: The Tampa Underground and Beyond  compiled and produced by George Petros (Cleopatra Records, 2003)
New York City Rock N Roll  compiled and produced by Steven Blush; project coordinator etc.: George Petros (Radical Records, 2004)
Easy Listening Acid Trip  compiled by George Petros, 1987-2007

External links
 georgepetros.com
Exitmagazine.net
Secondsmagazine.com

American magazine editors
Living people
1955 births
Artists from Chicago
Illinois Institute of Art – Chicago alumni